The Weskus Marathon (English: Westcoast Marathon) is a marathon race held annually in the West Coast Nature Reserve (Weskus Nasionale Park), next to Langebaan on South Africa's West Coast (Atlantic coast).

Runners are driven to the starting point by bus.  The race is run entirely in the nature reserve, except for the finish in Langebaan.  The route is memorable for its scenery with runners taking in views of the sea and lagoon.  There is a "heartbreak hill" at the 39 km mark where many runners are forced to walk.

Marathons in South Africa
Sport in the Western Cape